Goodman is an unincorporated community in Coffee County, Alabama, United States, located  west-southwest of Enterprise. As of 2007, its population was 2,453.

References

Unincorporated communities in Coffee County, Alabama
Unincorporated communities in Alabama